Nypa fruticans, commonly known as the nipa palm (or simply nipa, from ) or mangrove palm, is a species of palm native to the coastlines and estuarine habitats of the Indian and Pacific Oceans. It is the only palm considered adapted to the mangrove biome. The genus Nypa and the subfamily Nypoideae are monotypic taxa because this species is their only member.

Description

Unlike most palms, the nipa palm's trunk grows beneath the ground; only the leaves and flower stalk grow upwards above the surface.

The flowers are a globular inflorescence of female flowers at the tip with catkin-like red or yellow male flowers on the lower branches. The ripe nuts separate from the ball and float away on the tide, occasionally germinating while still water-borne.

Fossil record 
While only one species of Nypa now exists, N. fruticans, with a natural distribution extending from Northern Australia through the Indonesian Archipelago and the Philippine Islands up to China, the genus Nypa once had a nearly global distribution in the Eocene (56–33.4 million years ago).

Fossil mangrove palm pollen from India has been dated to 70 million years ago.

Fossil fruits and seeds of Nypa have been described from the Maastrichtian and Danian sediments of the Dakhla Formation of Bir Abu Minqar, South Western Desert, Egypt.

Fossilized nuts of Nypa dating to the Eocene occur in the sandbeds of Branksome, Dorset, and in London Clay on the Isle of Sheppey, Kent, England.

A fossil species, N. australis, has been described from Early Eocene sediments at Macquarie Harbour on the western coast of Tasmania.

Fossils of Nypa have also been recovered from throughout the New World, in North and South America, dating from at least the Maastrichtian period of the Cretaceous through the Eocene, making its last appearance in the fossil record of North and South America in the late Eocene.

Assuming the habitat of extinct Nypa is similar to that of the extant species N. fruticans, the presence of Nypa fossils may indicate monsoonal or at least seasonal rainfall regimes, and likely tropical climates. The worldwide distribution of Nypa in the Eocene, especially in deposits from polar latitudes, is supporting evidence that the Eocene was a time of global warmth, prior to the formation of modern polar icecaps at the end of the Eocene.

Distribution and habitat 
Nipa palms grow in soft mud and slow-moving tidal and river waters that bring in nutrients. They can be found as far inland as the tide can deposit the floating nuts. They are common on coasts and rivers flowing into the Indian and Pacific Oceans, from India to the Pacific Islands. The palm will survive occasional short-term drying of its environment. Despite the name "mangrove palm" and its prevalence in coastal areas, it is only moderately salt tolerant and suffers if exposed to pure seawater; it prefers the brackish waters of estuaries. 

It is considered native to China (Hainan), the Ryukyu Islands, Bangladesh, India, Sri Lanka, the Andaman and Nicobar Islands, Myanmar, Cambodia, Thailand, Vietnam, Borneo, Java, Maluku, Malaysia, Singapore, the Philippines, Sulawesi, Sumatra, the Bismarck Archipelago, New Guinea, the Solomon Islands, the Caroline Islands, and Australia (Queensland and the Northern Territory). It is reportedly naturalized  in Nigeria, the Society Islands of French Polynesia, the Mariana Islands, Panama, and Trinidad.

Japan's Iriomote Island and its neighboring Uchibanari Island are the most northern limit of the distribution.

Ecology
Long-tailed macaques (Macaca fascicularis) are known to eat the fruits of the nipa palm. Proboscis monkeys in the Padas Damit Forest Reserve have been observed eating the inflorescences. Bornean orangutans eat nipa palm hearts and shoots.

Uses

The long, feathery leaves of the nipa palm are used by local populations as roof material for thatched houses or dwellings. The leaves are also used in many types of basketry and thatching.  Because they are buoyant, large stems are used to train swimmers in Burma.

On the islands of Roti and Savu, nipa palm sap is fed to pigs during the dry season. This is said to impart a sweet flavour to the meat. The young leaves are dried, bleached and cut to wrap tobacco for smoking, this practice is also found in Sumatra.

In Cambodia, this palm is called  cha:k; its leaves are used to cover roofs.

Roof thatching with the leaves occurs in many places in Papua New Guinea. In some coastal areas, the rachis is used for walls in houses, and the leaflets are used for ornaments. The epidermises of the leaves are used as cigarette papers.

Food and beverages

The young flower stalk and hard seeds are edible and provide hydration.

In the Philippines and Malaysia, the inflorescence can be "tapped" to yield a sweet, edible sap collected to produce a local alcoholic beverage called tuba, bahal, or tuak. A fruit cluster is ready to be tapped when the unripe fruits are at their peak sweetness. The cluster is cut from the stalk about six inches down, and mud is rubbed on the stalk to induce sap flow. Sap begins flowing immediately if the fruit maturity was correctly gauged. A bamboo tube or a bottle is fitted over the cut stalk and the sap is collected twice daily, cutting a half centimeter slice off the end of the stalk after each collection to prevent it from gumming over. Sap flow will continue for 30 days per stalk, and the nipa flowers continuously throughout the year, providing a continuous supply of sap.

Tuba can be stored in tapayan (earthenware balloon vases) for several weeks to make a kind of vinegar known as sukang paombong in the Philippines and cuka nipah in Malaysia. Tuba can also be distilled to make arrack, locally known as lambanog in Filipino and arak or arak nipah in Indonesian. Young shoots are also edible; the flower petals can be infused to make an aromatic tisane. Attap chee  (chee meaning "seed" in several Chinese dialects) is a name for the immature fruits—sweet, translucent, gelatinous balls used as a dessert ingredient in Thailand, Malaysia, the Philippines, and Singapore, that are a byproduct of the sap harvesting process.

In Indonesia, especially in Java and Bali, the sap can  be used to make a variant of Jaggery called gula nipah. In Sarawak, it is called gula apong.

In Thailand, leaf is used for dessert.

In Cambodia, its leaves are used for wrapping cakes (such as num katâm), and the flowers are sometimes used to make sugar, vinegar, and alcohol.

Biofuel
The nipa palm produces a very high yield of sugar-rich sap. Fermented into ethanol or butanol, the sap may allow the production of 6480–20,000 liters per hectare per year of fuel. By contrast, sugarcane yields roughly 5200 liters of ethanol per hectare per year, and an equivalent area planted in corn (maize) would produce only roughly 4000 liters per hectare per year, before accounting for the energy costs of the cultivation and alcohol extraction. Unlike corn and sugarcane, nipa palm sap requires little if any fossil fuel energy to produce from an established grove, does not require arable land, and can make use of brackish water instead of freshwater resources. Also unlike most energy crops, the nipa palm does not detract from food production to make fuel. In fact, since nipa fruit is an inevitable byproduct of sap production, it produces both food and fuel simultaneously.

See also
Bahay kubo

References

External links
 

Arecaceae
Edible plants
Flora of Queensland
Flora of the Northern Territory
Flora of the Ryukyu Islands
Flora of tropical Asia
Mangroves
Trees of Australia
Trees of the Pacific
Tropical fruit
Central Indo-Pacific flora